Kailas Menon is an Indian film composer who works predominantly in Malayalam films and commercials. After working as a composer for television commercials for more than a decade, he debuted as a composer in feature films with director Jayaraj's Pakarnnatam. His first mainstream release happened much later with Theevandi, for which he earned his first  Filmfare Award.

Early life 
Kailas was born in Thrissur, Kerala on 30 May 1986. He learned carnatic music for eight years and was a self-trained keyboard player. He completed his schooling from Bharatiya Vidya Bhavan, Thrissur. He graduated in Visual Communications from SRM Institute of Science and Technology, Chennai, and pursued a course in sound engineering from SAE Institute, Chennai.

Career
Menon had his first release, the music album Snehathode, at the age of 16.

His professional career began much later, when he joined as an assistant to Malayalam film composer Ouseppachan and subsequently became a sound engineer for Gopi Sunder.

This was followed by a decade-long stint as a composer of television commercials, having scored for over 1000 commercials for brands like Rolls-Royce, Samsung, Toshiba, Unilever, and Bhima Jewellers.

He debuted as a film composer with Jayaraj's off-beat film Pakarnnattam. This was followed by Starring Pournami , which was shelved midway. His first mainstream release happened much later, with Theevandi. The song "Jeevamshamayi", rendered by Shreya Goshal and K. S. Harisankar, earned him a Filmfare Award.

In 2019, he launched his own music label, Kailas Menon Productions, and the first film album released from the label was Finals.

Personal life

Menon married Annapoorna Lekha Pillai, a lawyer at the Kerala High Court, on 8 December 2014. Their son, Samanyu Rudra, was born on 17 August 2020.

Film discography

Awards and nominations

References

External links

Kailas Menon at MSI

Indian film score composers
Living people
Film musicians from Kerala
Musicians from Thrissur
People from Thrissur district
1986 births